Club Patín Areces is a Spanish roller hockey team based in Grado, Asturias.

History
Founded in 1965 with the name of their main sponsor, Cafés Areces, the team promoted for the first time to the top tier in 1994, remaining only two seasons before its relegation. It became a yo-yo club between the first and second division, until 2001, when it relegates to the second division, remaining there until 2015. In that season, the club was newly relegated to the third division after an outrageous season.

Season to season

Trophies
Second division: (2)
1993–94, 2000–01
Copa Príncipe de Asturias: (1)
2007

References

Spanish rink hockey clubs
Sports clubs established in 1965
Sports teams in Asturias